The following is a bibliography of Saskatchewan history.

Surveys and reference
 Encyclopedia of Saskatchewan (2006) from U. of Regina Canadian Plains Research Center, (2005); 1071pp in print edition; article by experts on a very wide range of top
 The Canadian Encyclopedia (2008) A free online encyclopedia
 The Dictionary of Canadian Biography(1966–2006), scholarly biographies of well-known people who died by 1930
 Archer, John H. Saskatchewan: A History. Saskatoon: Western Producer Prairie Books, 1980. 422 pp.; detailed bibliography on pp 385–402 
 Barnhart, Gordon L., ed. Saskatchewan Premiers of the Twentieth Century. Regina: Canadian Plains Research Center, 2004. 418 pp.
 Bocking, D.H. Pages from the Past: Essays on Saskatchewan History (1979), popular history 
 Boswell, Randy. Province with a Heart: Celebrating 100 Years in Saskatchewan (2005) 224pp, popular history excerpts and text search
 Eisler, Dale. "The Saskatchewan Myth." The Heavy Hand of History: Interpreting Saskatchewan's Past (2005): 67-85. online
 Francis, Douglas R. and Palmer, Howard, eds. The Prairie West: Historical Readings. Edmonton: Pica Pica Press, 1990 (2nd ed.).
 Friesen, Gerald. The Canadian Prairies: A History (2nd ed. 1987)
 Loewen, Royden. "On the Margin or in the Lead: Canadian Prairie Historiography," Agricultural History 73, no. 1 (Winter 1999): 27-45. in JSTOR
 Pitsula, James M. "Disparate Duo" Beaver 2005 85(4): 14-24, a comparison with Alberta, Fulltext in EBSCO
 Porter, Jene M., ed.  Perspectives of Saskatchewan (University of Manitoba Press, 2009.) Pp. 377, 18 essays by scholars in several disciplines
 Richards, J. Howard and K.I. Fung, eds. Atlas of Saskatchewan (1969)
 Waiser, Bill. Saskatchewan: A New History (2005), 563 pp. a major scholarly survey
 Wright, Jim, A. W. Davey, and Alexander Robb. Saskatchewan: The history of a Province (McClelland and Stewart, 1955)

Politics, law, government
 Barnhart, Gordon L. Peace, Progress and Prosperity: A Biography of Saskatchewan's First Premier, T. Walter Scott (2000) 
 Biggs, L. and Stobbe, M., ed. Devine Rule in Saskatchewan: A Decade of Hope and Hardship. Saskatoon: Fifth House, 1991. 342 pp 
 Brownsey, Keith. "Policy, Bureaucracy and Personality: Woodrow Lloyd and the Introduction of Medicare in Saskatchewan," Prairie Forum 1998 23(2): 197-210
 Eisler, Dale. Rumours of Glory: Saskatchewan and the Thatcher Years (1987). covers 1964-71 using 134 interviews with prominent figures
 Gruending, Dennis. Promises to Keep: A Political Biography of Allan Blakeney. (1990). 288 pp.
 Harding, Jim, ed. Social Policy and Social Justice: The NDP Government in Saskatchewan during the Blakeney Years. (1995). 484 pp. 
 Johnson, A. W. Dream No Little Dreams: A Biography of the Douglas Government of Saskatchewan, 1944-1961. (2004). 370 pp.  excerpts and text search
 Lin, Zhiqiu. Policing the Wild North-West: A Sociological Study of the Provincial Police in Alberta and Saskatchewan, 1905-32 (2007) online
 Lipset, Seymour Martin. Agrarian Socialism: The Cooperative Commonwealth Federation in Saskatchewan, a Study in Political Sociology (1950) online edition
 Laycock, David. Populism and Democratic Thought in the Canadian Prairies, 1910 to 1945. U. of Toronto Press, 1990. 369 pp.
 Leeson, Howard, ed. Saskatchewan Politics: Into the Twenty-First Century. Regina: Canadian Plains Research Center, 2001. 425 pp.
 McGrane, David. Remaining Loyal: Social Democracy in Quebec and Saskatchewan (McGill-Queen's Press-MQUP, 2014)
 Pitsula, James M. and Ken Rasmussen. Privatizing a Province: The New Right in Saskatchewan. (1990), an attack from the left
 Pitsula, James M. Keeping Canada British: The Ku Klux Klan in 1920s Saskatchewan (University of British Columbia Press; 2013) 308 pages
 Quiring, David M. CCF Colonialism in Northern Saskatchewan: Battling Parish Priests, Bootleggers, and Fur Sharks. Vancouver: UBC Press, 2004.
 Quiring, Brett. "The Social and Political Philosophy of Woodrow S. Lloyd," Saskatchewan History 2004 56(1): 5-20.
 Smith, David E. Prairie Liberalism: The Liberal Party in Saskatchewan, 1905-71 (1975) 352 pages
 Smith, Dennis. Rogue Tory: The Life and Legend of John G. Diefenbaker. Toronto: Macfarlane Walter & Ross, 1995. 702 pp.
 Spencer, Dick. Singing the Blues: The Conservatives in Saskatchewan. (2007) 259 pp.
 Stewart, Walter. The Life and Political Times of Tommy Douglas. (2003)
 Wardhaugh, Robert A. Mackenzie King and the Prairie West. (2000). 328 pp.
 Warnock, John W. Saskatchewan: The Roots of Discontent and Protest (2004) 256 pages excerpts and text search
 Weir, Erin. Saskatchewan at a Crossroads: Fiscal Policy and Social Democratic Politics (2004)  excerpts and text search
 Young, Walter D. The Anatomy of a Party: The National CCF, 1932–1961, (1969) 328 pages

Economy, settlement, agriculture
 Anderson, Alan B. Settling Saskatchewan (U of Regina Press, 2013),  "a comprehensive historical, geographical, and sociological overview"  of the province's ethnic bloc or group settlements.
 Carter, Sarah. Lost Harvests: Prairie Indian Reserve Farmers and Government Policy. Montreal and Kingston: McGill-Queen's University Press, 1990.
 Dale-Burnett, Lisa, ed. Saskatchewan Agriculture: Lives Past and Present. Regina: Canadian Plains Research Center, (2006) 205 pp. short biographies
 Danysk, Cecilia. Hired Hands: Labour and the Development of Prairie Agriculture, 1880-1930. (1995). 231 pp.
 Friesen, Gerald. The Canadian Prairies: A History (1984) 
 Love, Ronald S. Sasktel: The Biography of a Crown Corporation and the Development of Telecommunications in Saskatchewan (2003) 
 McManus, Curtis R. Happyland: A History of the "Dirty Thirties" in Saskatchewan, 1914-1937 (University of Calgary Press, 2011) 326 pages. Argues that the agricultural crisis known as the "Dirty Thirties" began decades earlier and was only partly connected to the Great Depression. online free
 Morton, Arthur S. and Chester Martin, History of prairie settlement (1938) 511pp
 Norrie, K. H. "The Rate of Settlement of the Canadian Prairies, 1870-1911," Journal of Economic History, Vol. 35, No. 2 (Jun., 1975), pp. 410–427 in JSTOR; statistical models
 Palmer, Howard. The Settlement of the West (1977) online edition
 Rea, J. E. "The Wheat Board & the Western Farmer." Beaver 1997 77(1): 14-23.  Fulltext: Ebsco
 Rediger, Pat. The Crowns: A History of Public Enterprise in Saskatchewan. Regina: Canadian Plains Research Centre, 2004.
 Strikwerda, Eric J. "From Short-term Emergency to Long-term Crisis: Public Works Projects in Saskatoon, 1929-1932." Prairie Forum 2001 26(2): 169-186.
 Strikwerda, Eric. The Wages of Relief: Cities and the Unemployed in Prairie Canada, 1929-39 (Athabasca University Press, 2012)
 Warren, Jim and Carlisle, Kathleen, eds. On the Side of the People: A History of Labour in Saskatchewan. Regina: Coteau Books, 2005. 344 pp.

Society, culture
 Barron, F. Laurie. Walking in Indian Moccasins: The Native Policies of Tommy Douglas and the CCF (1997)
 Bennett, John W. and Seena B. Kohl. Settling the Canadian-American West, 1890-1915: Pioneer Adaptation and Community Building. An Anthropological History. (1995). 311 pp. online edition
 Bliss, Jacqueline. "Seamless Lives: Pioneer Women of Saskatoon 1883-1903." Saskatchewan History 1991 43(3): 84-100
 Bowen, Dawn Suzanne. "'Forward to a Farm': The Back-to-the-Land Movement as a Relief Initiative in Saskatchewan during the Great Depression." PhD dissertation Queen's U., 1998. 279 pp. DAI 1999 59(7): 2660-A. DANQ27817 Fulltext: ProQuest Dissertations & Theses
 Calder, Alison and Wardhaugh, Robert, ed. History, Literature, and the Writing of the Canadian Prairies.U. of Manitoba Press, 2005. 310 pp.
 Clark, Jessica, and Thomas D. Isern, "Germans from Russia in Saskatchewan: An Oral History," American Review of Canadian Studies, Spring 2010, Vol. 40 Issue 1, pp 71–85
 Cottrell, Michael. "The Irish in Saskatchewan, 1850-1930: a Study of Intergenerational Ethnicity." Prairie Forum 1999 24(2): 185-209. Counting both Catholics and Protestants Irish comprised 10% of the population
 DeBrou, Dave and Moffatt, Aileen, eds. "Other" Voices: Historical Essays on Saskatchewan Women. (1995). 166 pp.
 DeClercy, Cristine. "Women and the Public Sphere in Saskatchewan, 1905-2005." Prairie Forum 2007 32(2): 357-382.  
 Dick, Lyle. Farmers "Making Good": The Development of Abernethy District, Saskatchewan 1880-1920 (1989), 
 Emery, George. The Methodist Church on the Prairies, 1896-1914. (2001). 259 pp.
 Fairbanks, C. and S.B. Sundberg. Farm Women on the Prairie Frontier. (1983) 
 Friesen, Victor Carl. Where the Rivers Run: Stories of the Saskatchewan and the People Drawn to Its Shores. (2001.) 480 pp.
 Gray, James. Booze: The Impact of Whisky On the Prairie West (Toronto: Macmillan, 1972.)
 Hayden, Michael. Seeking a Balance: The University of Saskatchewan, 1907-1982 (1983) online edition
 Hengen, Girard. "A Case Study in Urban Reform: Regina Before the First World War," Saskatchewan History 1988 41(1): 19-34
 Hewitt, Steve. Riding to the Rescue: The Transformation of the RCMP in Alberta and Saskatchewan, 1914-1939. (2006). 205 pp.
 Hinther, Rhonda L. and Jim Mochoruk, eds. Re-Imagining Ukrainian-Canadians: History, Politics, and Identity (2010)
 Hodgson, Heather, ed. Saskatchewan Writers: Lives Past and Present. Regina: Canadian Plains Research Center, 2004. 247 pp. short biographies 
 Jones, David C. Empire of Dust: Settling and Abandoning the Prairie Dry Belt. (1987) 316 pp.
 Jones, Harlo L. O Little Town: Remembering Life in a Prairie Village. (1995). 236 pp. memoir of the town of Dinsmore
 Keahey, Deborah. Making It Home: Place in Canadian Prairie Literature. (1998). 178 pp.
 Korinek, Valerie. Prairie Fairies: A History of Queer Communities and People in Western Canada, 1930-1985. Toronto: University of Toronto Press, 2018.
 Lalone, Meika and LaClare, Elton. Discover Saskatchewan: A Guide to Historic Sites. (1998). 206 pp.
 Langford, N. "Childbirth on the Canadian Prairies 1880-1930." Journal of Historical Sociology, 1995. Vol. 8, No. 3, pp. 278–302.
 Langford, Nanci Louise. "First Generation and Lasting Impressions: The Gendered Identities of Prairie Homestead Women." PhD dissertation U. of Alberta 1994. 229 pp. DAI 1995 56(4): 1544-A. DANN95214 Fulltext: ProQuest Dissertations & Theses
 LaPointe, Richard and Tessier, Lucille. The Francophones of Saskatchewan: A History. Regina: U. of Regina, Campion Coll., 1988. 329 pp.
 Loewen, Royden and Frisen, Gerald. Immigrants in Prairie Cities: Ethnic Diversity in Twentieth Century Canada. Toronto: University of Toronto Press, 2009.
 Mackintosh, W. A. Prairie Settlement, the Geographical Setting (Toronto, 1934). 
 Massie, Merle. Forest Prairie Edge: Place History in Saskatchewan. Winnipeg: University of Manitoba Press, 2014.
 McCourt, Edward. Saskatchewan (1968) travel
 Macpherson, Ian. "Missionaries of Rural Development: the Fieldmen of the Saskatchewan Wheat Pool, 1925-1965." Agricultural History 1986 60(2): 73-96 in JSTOR.
 Moffatt, Aileen Catherine.  "Experiencing Identity: British-Canadian Women in Rural Saskatchewan, 1880-1950." PhD dissertation U. of Manitoba 1996. 324 pp. DAI 1997 58(4): 1411-A. DANN16212 Fulltext: ProQuest Dissertations & Theses
 Millions, Erin. "Breaking the Mould: a Historiographical Review of Saskatchewan Women's History, 1880-1930." Saskatchewan History 2002 54(2): 31-49. 
 Olfert, M. Rose and Jack C. Stabler, "Rural Communities of the Saskatchewan Prairie Landscape." Prairie Forum 2000 25(1): 123-138.  
 Palmer, Howard. The Settlement of the West (1977) online edition
 Parson, Edna Tyson. Land I Can Own: A Biography of Anthony Tyson and the Pioneers Who Homesteaded with Him in Neidpath, Saskatchewan (1981) 
 Pitsula, James M. "Muscular Saskatchewan: Provincial Self-identity in the 1920s." Saskatchewan History 2002 54(2): 6-17. 
 Rollings-Magnusson, Sandra. "Canada's Most Wanted: Pioneer Women on the Western Prairies." Canadian Review of Sociology and Anthropology 2000 37(2): 223-238.  Fulltext: Ebsco
 Shepard, Bruce R. Deemed Unsuitable. Toronto: Umbrella Press, 1997.
 Swyripa, Frances.  Storied Landscapes: Ethno-Religious Identity and the Canadian Prairies (University of Manitoba Press, 2010)  296 pp.   online review
 Taylor, Georgina M. "'Ground for Common Action': Violet McNaughton's Agrarian Feminism and the Origins of the Farm Women's Movement in Canada." PhD dissertation Carleton U. 1997. 617 pp. DAI 1998 59(4): 1300-A. DANQ26870 Fulltext: ProQuest Dissertations & Theses
 Thompson, Christian, ed. Saskatchewan First Nations: Lives Past and Present (2004), short biographies 
 Thompson, John Herd. Forging the Prairie West. (1998)
 Titley, E. Brian. The Indian Commissioners: Agents of the State and Indian Policy in Canada's Prairie West, 1873-1932 (University of Alberta Press, 2009)
 Wardhaugh, Robert A., ed. Toward Defining the Prairies: Region, Culture, and History. (2001). 234 pp.
 White, Clinton O. Power For a Province: A History of Saskatchewan Power. Regina: Canadian Plains Research Center, 1976.
 Widdis, Randy William. Voices from Next Year Country: An Oral History of Rural Saskatchewan. Regina: Canadian Plains Research Centre, 2006.
 Wurtele, Susan Elizabeth. "Nation-Building from the Ground Up: Assimilation through Domestic and Community Transformation in Inter-War Saskatchewan." PhD dissertation Queen's U., 1993. 414 pp. DAI 1994 55(1): 135-A. DANN85326 Fulltext: ProQuest Dissertations & Theses

Primary sources

 Hillis, Doris, ed. Plainspeaking: Interviews with Saskatchewan Writers. (1988). 304 pp.
 Kates, Jack. Don't You Know It's Forty Below? Cypress, Calif.: Seal, 2000. 451 pp. life in Sheho
 Paget, Amelia M. People of the Plains. (1909, reprint 2004). 199 pp.
 Smith, David E., ed. Building a Province: A History of Saskatchewan in Documents. Saskatoon: Fifth House, 1993. 443 pp.
 Thomas, Lewis Herbert, and T. C. Douglas. The Making of a Socialist: The Recollections of T.C. Douglas'' (1984) online edition

Maps

 railway map (about 1931)
 Highways, (1926)
 political map (2001)
 Geological Atlas of Saskatchewan (2007)

See also

Bibliography of Canada
Bibliography of Canadian history
Bibliography of Nova Scotia
Bibliography of Alberta history
Bibliography of British Columbia
Bibliography of the 1837-1838 insurrections in Lower Canada
List of books about the War of 1812

 
Saskatchewan History